Thomas "Tom" Cox (February 24, 1936) was a NASCAR driver.  He won the 1962 NASCAR Rookie of the Year Award.

References

External links
 

1936 births
NASCAR drivers
Living people